The Cautário River is a river of Rondônia state in western Brazil. It is a right tributary of the Guaporé River.

Course

The Cautário River rises in the Uru-Eu-Wau-Wau Indigenous Territory.
It is fed by streams from the  Serra Uopianes and the  Serra Pacaás Novos.
The river runs in a southwest direction, forming the boundary between the Rio Cautário Federal Extractive Reserve and the Rio Cautário State Extractive Reserve.
It flows into the Guaporé/Mamoré river, which in turn feeds the Madeira River at the city of Nova Mamoré.

The Cautário River has clear waters fed by a region without major deforestation and silting of the river's margins. 
These include Bom Destino, Desengano, Esperança and Cujubim. 
The most rugged stretch is between Redenção e Bom Destino.
It is navigable, even in the middle section around Bom Destino, but only in the rainy season.
During the dry season the river bed has extensive sandbanks.

See also
List of rivers of Rondônia

References

Sources

Rivers of Rondônia